Conochitina is an extinct genus of chitinozoans.

The Luofengxi Group of the Geology of Fujian in China contains metamorphosed sandstone in which Leiomarginata and Conochitina incerta fossils have been found.

See also 
 List of chitinozoan genera

References

External links 

 
 Conochitina at fossiilid.info

Enigmatic prehistoric animal genera
Prehistoric marine animals
Fossil taxa described in 1931